Cooke's Canyon or Cookes Canyon, a valley and ephemeral stream, located on the eastern slope of the Cooke's Range in Luna County, New Mexico. The mouth of Cooke's Canyon is at its confluence with Fort Cummings Draw. 

Cooke's Canyon is named for Lt. Col. Philip St. George Cooke, who commanded the Mormon Battalion from Santa Fe to San Diego, California during the Mexican War. Their task was to establish a wagon road, which later was called Cooke's Wagon Road, and became the primary route used by the Southern Emigrant Trail.  The Mormon Battalion crossed Cooke's Canyon on 17 November 1846. The upper part of Cooke's Canyon is part of what was called Cooke's Pass, a narrow gap, running east and west, through which the Southern Emigrant Trail passed through Cooke's Range.

References 

History of Luna County, New Mexico
Landforms of Luna County, New Mexico
Canyons and gorges of New Mexico